Upton Fen lies within The Broads National Park in Norfolk, England.

It is a nature reserve in the care of Norfolk Wildlife Trust. Notable species found on the reserve include:
Eurasian bittern,
Hobby,
Norfolk Hawker and 
Old World swallowtail.

Norfolk Broads
Fens of England